Inna Ryzhykh (Ukrainian Інна Володимирівна Рижих; born 15 November 1985 in Dnipropetrovsk, Ukrainian Дніпропетровськ) is a professional Ukrainian triathlete, silver medalist at the Ukrainian Championships of 2010, and a permanent member of the national team.

At the European Police Championships in Kitzbuhel (15 August 2010), Ryzhykh placed 3rd in the individual ranking and 1st in the team ranking together with Yuliya Sapunova and Victoria Kachan.

ITU Competitions 
In the six years from 2005 to 2010, Ryzhykh took part in 21 ITU competitions, achieving 4 top ten positions.

The following list is based upon the official ITU rankings and the "Athlete's Profile Page."
Unless indicated otherwise, the following events are triathlons (Olympic distance) and belong to the Elite category.

Notes

External links 
 Ukrainian Triathlon Federation in Ukrainian

1985 births
Living people
Ukrainian female triathletes
European Games competitors for Ukraine
Triathletes at the 2015 European Games
Sportspeople from Dnipro